A mosaic virus is any virus that causes infected plant foliage to have a mottled appearance. Such viruses come from a variety of unrelated lineages and consequently there is no taxon that unites all mosaic viruses. All the symptoms of each virus or complex appear the same, so the only way to know exactly which viral subtype is infecting a plant is to send it to a local extension service. Alternatively, commercial testing kits exist for settings like greenhouses.

Examples 
Virus species that contain the word 'mosaic' in their English language common name, as of March 2019, are listed below. However, not all viruses that may cause a mottled appearance belong to species that include the word "mosaic" in the name.

See also 
 Mosaic

References

External links 
 

Viral plant pathogens and diseases
Viruses